Derxia is a genus of Gram-negative, nitrogen-fixing bacteria from the family of Alcaligenaceae.

References

Burkholderiales
Bacteria genera